A1 Team South Africa was the South African team of A1 Grand Prix, an international racing series.

Management 

A1 Team South Africa's owner was Tokyo Sexwale. The Chief Executive Officer of the team was Dana Cooper and the technical and sporting manager was Mike Carroll. For the 2006–07 season South Africa have enlisted DAMS to run their car, the outfit which ran the French and Swiss teams to 1st and 2nd places in 2005–06.

History

2005–06 season 

Drivers: Tomas Scheckter, Stephen Simpson

In the inaugural season, Team South Africa scored a podium en route to 17th place in the championship.

2006–07 season 

Drivers: Stephen Simpson, Alan van der Merwe, Adrian Zaugg

Team South Africa had mixed fortunes in 2006–07. A victory, a podium and two high-placing results were offset by other bad results and the team finished in 14th position.

2007–08 season 

Driver: Adrian Zaugg

Consistent scoring, two victories and two podiums brought Team South Africa to 5th place in the championship.

2008–09 season 

Drivers: Adrian Zaugg, Alan van der Merwe

Drivers

Complete A1 Grand Prix results 

(key), "spr" indicate a Sprint Race, "fea" indicate a Main Race.

External links
A1gp.com Official A1 Grand Prix Web Site
Official A1 Team South Africa web site
Stephen Simpson

South Africa A1 team
A
South African auto racing teams
Auto racing teams established in 2005
Auto racing teams disestablished in 2009